The 2022 SAFF U-20 Championship was the 4th edition of the SAFF U-20 Championship, an international football competition for men's under-18 national teams organized by South Asian Football Federation (SAFF). India was the hosts of the tournament, held between 25 July and 5 August 2022. 

India clinched the title defeating Bangladesh by 5–2 in the final on 5 August 2022.

Venue
All matches were played at Kalinga Stadium in Bhubaneswar, India.

Participating teams 
FIFA suspended Pakistan Football Federation on 7 April 2021, so they cannot participate in this competition. Bhutan abstained from participation due to government restrictions.

Players eligibility
Players born on or after 1 January 2003 are eligible to compete in the tournament. Each team has to register a squad of minimum 16 players and maximum 23 players, minimum two of whom must be goalkeepers.

Officials

Referees
 Mohammed Nassir Uddin (Bangladesh)
 S. M. Junayed Sharif (Bangladesh)
 Mrutyunjay Lingaraj Amatya (India)
 Sinan Hussain (Maldives)
 Afsah Ahmed (Maldives)
 Prajwol Chhetri (Nepal)
 Kanaya K. Yadav (Nepal)
 W. Lakmal Weerakody (Sri Lanka)

Assistant Referees
 Suman Majumdar (India)
 D. D. I.  Sendanayaka (Sri Lanka)

Round robin stage
Times listed are UTC+05:30.

Final

Goalscorers

See also 
 2022 SAFF U-18 Women's Championship
 2022 SAFF U-17 Championship
 2022 SAFF Women's Championship

References 

2021
2022 in Asian football
2020–21 in Nepalese football
2020–21 in Indian football
2021 in Bhutanese football
2021 in Bangladeshi football
2021 in Maldivian football
2020–21 in Sri Lankan football 
2021 in youth association football
SAFF
SAFF
Sports competitions in Odisha